The Estonia women's national football team represents Estonia in international women's football matches and are controlled by the Estonian Football Association, the governing body for football in Estonia.

Estonia played its first international match on 19 August 1994 against Lithuania. The team's home ground is the Lilleküla Stadium in Tallinn, and the current managers are Anastassia Morkovkina and Sirje Roops. Estonia has never qualified for the FIFA Women's World Cup or the UEFA Women's Championship. They have won the annual Women's Baltic Cup 11 times.

Team image

Nicknames
The Estonia women's national football team has been known or nicknamed as the "Sinisärgid (Blueshirts)".

Results and fixtures

Recent results within the last 12 months and upcoming fixtures.

2022

2023

Coaching staff

Players

Current squad
The following players were named to the squad for the 2023 Turkish Women's Cup in February 2023.

Caps and goals updated as of 21 February 2023, after the match against North Macedonia.

Recent call-ups
The following players have been called up to the squad within the last twelve months.

INJ Withdrew due to injury
PRE Preliminary squad / standby
RET Retired from the national team
SUS Serving suspension
WD Player withdrew from the squad due to non-injury issue

Records

Most caps

Players in bold are still active with Estonia.

Top goalscorers

Competitive record

FIFA Women's World Cup

Draws include knockout matches decided on penalty kicks.

UEFA Women's Championship

Draws include knockout matches decided on penalty kicks.

Baltic Cup

Honours
Women's Baltic Cup
 Champions (11): 2003, 2004, 2005, 2006, 2008, 2009, 2010, 2012, 2013, 2014, 2022

See also

Sport in Estonia
Football in Estonia
Estonia women's national under-19 football team
Estonia women's national under-17 football team
Estonia national football team

References

External links

 
FIFA profile

 
national
European women's national association football teams